Dr. Karl Kurt Wolter (23 March 1905 – 7 December 1988) was a German philatelist who was added to the Roll of Distinguished Philatelists in 1976.

References

Signatories to the Roll of Distinguished Philatelists
1905 births
1988 deaths
German philatelists
Fellows of the Royal Philatelic Society London